Mustaqillik Maydoni is a station of the Tashkent Metro on Chilonzor Line. The station was opened on 6 November 1977 as part of the inaugural section of Tashkent Metro, between October inkilobi and Sabir Rakhimov. Prior to 1 November 1991 the name of the station was "V. I. Lenin Maidoni" ( "Vladimir Lenin Square").

References

Tashkent Metro stations
Railway stations opened in 1977
1977 establishments in Uzbekistan